Hrómundartindur is a mountain in Iceland north of Hveragerði. with an elevation of .

References

External links 
 Hrómundartindur in the Catalogue of Icelandic Volcanoes

Stratovolcanoes of Iceland